This is a list of birds that belong to the shearwater group, of the family Procellariidae and the order Procellariiformes.

This is a still evolving taxonomic class that may or may not include the genera Procellaria and Bulweria.  This list includes them both.
Some experts, most notably James Clements, have not yet to recognize the genus Pseudobulweria.

Calonectris
 Calonectris diomedea, Cory's shearwater, breeds in the Azore Islands, Canary Islands, Madeira Islands, assorted Mediterranean islands and Berlenga Island
 Calonectris diomedea diomedea, Scopoli's, breeds in the Azore Islands, Canary Islands, Madeira Islands, and Berlenga Island
 Calonectris diomedea borealis, borealis, breeds on assorted Mediterranean islands
 Calonectris edwardsii, Cape Verde shearwater breeds on Cape Verde Islands
 Calonectris leucomelas , streaked shearwater breeds on coastal islands of Japan and China; ranges to South Pacific

Puffinus
 Puffinus creatopus, pink-footed shearwater breeds on Mocha Island, Juan Fernández Islands; ranges to North Pacific
 Puffinus carneipes, flesh-footed shearwater southern Indian Ocean and southwestern Pacific Ocean; winters to Arabian Sea and northwestern Pacific Ocean
 Puffinus gravis, great shearwater breeds on islands in the South Atlantic Ocean; ranges in the North Atlantic Ocean to the Arctic Circle
 Puffinus pacificus, wedge-tailed shearwater ranges through tropical Pacific Ocean and Indian Ocean
 Puffinus bulleri, Buller's shearwater breeds on islands off the coast of New Zealand; ranges across the Pacific Ocean
 Puffinus griseus, sooty shearwater breeds on southeastern Australia, New Zealand, and southern South America; winters in North Pacific and North Atlantic
 Puffinus tenuirostris, short-tailed shearwater or Mutton bird breeds in Tasmania and southern Australia; winters in North Pacific
 Puffinus nativatis, Christmas shearwater ranges through tropical Central Pacific Ocean
 Puffinus subalaris, Galapagos shearwater breeds on the Galapagos Islands
 Puffinus puffinus, Manx shearwater breeds in the North Atlantic; ranges to Argentinian and South African water
 Puffinus yelkouan, Yelkouan shearwater breeds on central and eastern Mediterranean islands
 Puffinus mauretanicus, Balearic shearwater breeds on Balearic Islands; ranges to coastal northern Europe
 Puffinus huttoni, Hutton's shearwater breeds on northeastern South Island, New Zealand; ranges to Australia
 Puffinus auricularus, Townsend's shearwater breeds Kauai and Revillagigedo Islands; ranges to 8°N
 Puffinus auricularus auricularus, Townsend's, breeds Revillagigedo Islands; ranges to 8°N
 Puffinus auricularus newelli breeds Kauai
 Puffinus opisthomelas, black-vented shearwater breeds on islands off the west coast of Baja California; ranges in adjacent Mexican waters
 Puffinus gavia, fluttering shearwater breeds on the islands off the coast of New Zealand; ranges to Australia and Vanuatua
 Puffinus assimilis, little shearwater breeds on Azore Islands, Canary Island, Cape Verde Islands, Tristan da Cunha, and many other small islands in Oceania
 Puffinus assimilis baroli breeds on the Azore Islands, Canary Islands, Salvage Islands, and Desertas Islands
 Puffinus assimilis boydi breeds on the Cape Verde Islands
 Puffinus assimilis tunneyi breeds on Abrolhos Islands and Récherche Archipelago off of the southwestern coast of Australia
 Puffinus assimilis assimilis breeds on Norfolk Island and Lord Howe Island
 Puffinus assimilis kermadecensis breeds on Kermadec Islands
 Puffinus assimilis haurakiensis breeds on the islets off of the northeastern coast of North Island, New Zealand
 Puffinus assimilis elegans breeds on Tristan da Cunha, Gough Island, Chatham Island, and Antipodes Island
 Puffinus assimilis myrtae breeds on Rapa Island
 Puffinus lherminieri, Audubon's shearwater
 Puffinus lherminieri iherminieri breeds on Bahamas and the West Indies
 Puffinus lherminieri loyemilleri breeds on islets in the southwestern Caribbean
 Puffinus lherminieri dichrous breeds on islands throughout Central Pacific; Samoa to Marquesas Islands
 Puffinus lherminieri gunax breeds Banks Islands, Vanuatu
 Puffinus lherminieri bannermani breeds on Bonin Islands and Volcano Islands
 Puffinus lherminieri bailloni breeds on the Mascarene Islands
 Puffinus iherminieri nicolae breeds on islands in the northwestern Indian Ocean; Aldabra Islands to Seychelles and Maldives
 Puffinus lherminieri temptator breeds on Mohéli Island, Comoros Islands
 Puffinus persicus, Persian shearwater breeds and ranges in the Arabian Sea and adjacent waters
 Puffinus heinrothi, Heinroth's shearwater breeds on New Britain and Solomon Islands
 Puffinus atrodorsalis, Mascarene shearwater ranges to southwestern Indian Ocean

Pseudobulweria
 Pseudobulweria macgillivrayi, Fiji petrel breeds on Gau Island, Fiji
 Pseudobulweria rostrata, Tahiti petrel, breeds on Society Islands, Marquesas Islands, New Caledonia, and Rendova Island
 Pseudobulweria rostrata rostrata breeds on Marquesas Islands and Society Islands; ranges in tropical Pacific
 Pseudobulweria rostrata becki breeds on Rendova Island
 Pseudobulweria rostrata trouessarti breeds on New Caledonia; ranges to South Pacific
 Pseudobulweria becki, Beck's petrel breeds on Rendova Island
 Pseudobulweria aterrima, Mascarene petrel breeds on Réunion; ranges to Indian Ocean
 Pseudobulweria rupinarum, large Saint Helena petrel (extinct)

Lugensa
 Lugensa brevirostris, Kerguelen petrel breeds on Tristan da Cunha, Gough Island, Prince Edward Island, Crozet Islands and Kerguelen Islands

Bulweria
 Bulweria bulwerii, Bulwer's petrel breeds on Azore Islands, Cape Verde Islands, northwestern Hawaiian Islands, and Johnston Island
 Bulweria fallax, Jouanin's petrel ranges to northwestern Indian Ocean and southern Arabian Sea

Procellaria
 Procellaria cinerea, grey petrel breeds and ranges to circumpolar subantarctic islands
 Procellaria aequinoctialis, white-chinned petrel breeds on circumpolar subantarctic islands
 Procellaria conspicillata, spectacled petrel breeds on Inaccessible Island
 Procellaria parkinsoni, Parkinson's petrel breeds on Little Barrier Island and Great Barrier Island; ranges to South America
 Procellaria westlandica, Westland petrel breeds in New Zealand's South Island; ranges to Australia and western South America

Lists of birds
Shearwaters
Procellariiformes